Rubenilson Monteiro Ferreira (born 8 July 1972) is a retired football player. He played as an attacking midfielder. Born in Brazil, he was a youth international for Belgium.

References

External links
 
 
 
 
 
                                                                                                                                   
 Rubenilson Monteiro Ferreira at Royal Antwerp 
 
 
 

1972 births
Living people
People from São Luís, Maranhão
Belgian footballers
Belgium youth international footballers
Brazilian footballers
Brazilian emigrants to Belgium
Belgian people of Brazilian descent
Standard Liège players
R.W.D. Molenbeek players
Royal Antwerp F.C. players
OGC Nice players
Seongnam FC players
Bursaspor footballers
Maccabi Petah Tikva F.C. players
CF Extremadura footballers
FC U Craiova 1948 players
Belgian Pro League players
Ligue 1 players
Liga I players
K League 1 players
Süper Lig players
Israeli Premier League players
Belgian expatriate footballers
Brazilian expatriate footballers
Brazilian expatriate sportspeople in South Korea
Expatriate footballers in Israel
Expatriate footballers in Belgium
Expatriate footballers in France
Expatriate footballers in Romania
Expatriate footballers in Spain
Expatriate footballers in South Korea
Expatriate footballers in Turkey
Association football forwards
Sportspeople from Maranhão